Roberto Janet Durruty (born 29 August 1986) is a Cuban track and field athlete who competes in the hammer throw. He has a personal best of 77.08 metres, set in 2012. He is a two-time champion at the Central American and Caribbean Championships in Athletics and the Ibero-American Championships in Athletics. He represented Cuba at the 2011 Pan American Games and the 2012 Summer Olympics, as well as the 2013 and 2015 Athletics World Championships.

Life and career
Born in Santiago de Cuba Province, Janet began competing internationally in 2005 and was runner-up to Boldizsar Kocsor at the 2005 Pan American Junior Athletics Championships. He also came sixth at the 2005 ALBA Games. He set a best of 68.43 metres the following year and placed third at the 2006 NACAC Under-23 Championships in Athletics. His 2007 season was highlighted by a throw of 70.89 m (his first over seventy metres) at the Aurelio Janet Memorial. He continued this form into 2008 and improved to 71.92 metres.

Janet reached the top of the national scene in 2009 and won the Barrientos Memorial with a throw of 73.17 m. A personal best of 74.95 m preceded his first major win at the 2009 Central American and Caribbean Championships in Athletics, where he beat Cuban rival Noleysi Bicet. He won again at the Barriento Memorial in 2010 and a clearance of 75.98 m, continuing his upward trajectory. His second international title came at the 2010 Ibero-American Championships in Athletics as he broke Juan Ignacio Cerra's six-year dominance of the competition. He was chosen to represent the Americas at the 2010 IAAF Continental Cup and finished in fifth place overall.

Janet's progress stalled in 2011, as his seasonal best of 76.40 m was slightly short of his lifetime best. However, he performed well in international competition, defending his title at the 2011 CAC Championships and placed fifth at the Pan American Games. He won the 2012 Cuban Championships with a then personal best throw of 77.08 m. He won his second gold medal at the 2012 Ibero-American Championships and also won at the IAAF Centenary meet in Havana. He was selected for the Cuban team for the 2012 London Olympics but did not reach the final.

In 2013 he qualified for his first World Championships but did not reach the final.

2015 was better for him; he set a new personal best and reached the final of the 2015 World Championships.

Personal best
Hammer throw: 78.02 m –  La Habana, 28 May 2015

Achievements

References

External links

Sports reference biography

Living people
1986 births
Cuban male hammer throwers
Sportspeople from Santiago de Cuba
Athletes (track and field) at the 2011 Pan American Games
Athletes (track and field) at the 2012 Summer Olympics
Athletes (track and field) at the 2016 Summer Olympics
Olympic athletes of Cuba
Athletes (track and field) at the 2015 Pan American Games
Athletes (track and field) at the 2019 Pan American Games
World Athletics Championships athletes for Cuba
Pan American Games medalists in athletics (track and field)
Pan American Games silver medalists for Cuba
Central American and Caribbean Games gold medalists for Cuba
Central American and Caribbean Games bronze medalists for Cuba
Competitors at the 2014 Central American and Caribbean Games
Competitors at the 2018 Central American and Caribbean Games
Central American and Caribbean Games medalists in athletics
Medalists at the 2015 Pan American Games